The Imam of Friday Prayer (Arabic: امام صلاة الجمعة) or Imam Jom'a (Jumu'ah) is the person who conducts the Friday prayer in Islam and preaches related sermons.

Qualifications to serve
An Imam of Friday Prayer is expected to be distinguished for intellect ('Aql), faith (Iman), and righteousness. Traditionally, a Friday prayer imam must be male and, according to some, also of legitimate birth. Moreover, it is recommended (Mustahab) that the imam be eloquent, brave, watchful of prayer times, and true in his speech.

There are many rulings (Ahkam) regarding the Friday prayer that are common across the various branches and schools of Islam, but there are differences when it comes to qualifications. For instance, while there is a consensus about the five conditions—adulthood, intellect, correctness in reciting, and not otherwise excluded—there are disagreements as to the requirement to be a Mo'men (believer).

Infallible imams
Historically in Shi’a Islam, when an infallible imam (Ma'sum) is present, the position of Friday Imam is assumed by him or someone he appoints.

Temporary imams
The permanent Imam Jom'a of a city may appoint others to this office in a temporary capacity.

See also

 Salah al jama'ah
 Friday prayer
 List of Tehran's Friday Prayer Imams
 Imam

References

External links
 The Friday Prayer 
 Photos: Shia, Sunni Muslims hold joint Friday Prayer in Marneuli, Georgia 

Salah
Islamic terminology
Friday observances
Salah terminology